Orthez is a commune in the Pyrénées-Atlantiques department, and region of New Aquitaine, southwestern France.

It lies 40 km NW of Pau on the Southern railway to Bayonne. The town also encompasses the small village of Sainte-Suzanne, an independent commune until 1973; residents of the town are called either Orthéziens or Sainte-Suzannais.

Geography
Orthez straddles the westward-flowing Gave de Pau, with most of the town proper having developed on the right bank. Several residential developments and an industrial park are located on the left bank, in addition to Sainte-Suzanne, an associated village entity within the town. A partially artificial lake called 'Lac de l'y grec' (usually just spelled 'Lac de l'Y' i.e. 'Y Lake') has a pleasant, scenic walking trail. Orthez station has rail connections to Tarbes, Pau, Bordeaux and Bayonne.

History
During the 12th century, Orthez was the capital of Béarn, after Morlaàs and before Pau, which is still the prefectural administrative capital. At the end of the 12th century, Orthez passed from the possession of the viscounts of Dax to that of the viscounts of Bearn, whose chief place of residence it became in the 13th century. Froissart records the splendour of the court of Orthez under Gaston Phoebus in the latter half of the 14th century.

Jeanne d'Albret founded a Calvinist university in the town and Theodore Beza taught there for some time. An envoy sent in 1569 by Charles IX to revive the Catholic faith had to stand a siege in the battle of Orthez; the city was eventually taken by assault by the Protestant/Huguenot captain, Gabriel, count of Montgomery. In 1684 Nicholas Foucault, intendant under Louis XIV, was more successful, as the inhabitants, ostensibly at least, renounced Protestantism. It is nevertheless still a strong tradition in the town.

Another battle of Orthez occurred during the Napoleonic Wars on February 27, 1814, in which the British Duke of Wellington defeated Marshal Soult on the hills to the north of Orthez. Gaston Planté, the French physicist, was born here on the 22 April 1834; his major claim to fame was the invention in 1859 of the lead-acid battery, the common car battery.

Population

Sights
The Gave de Pau is crossed in Orthez by a 14th-century bridge, which has four arches and is surmounted at its centre by a tower. Several old houses, and a church of the 12th, 14th and 15th centuries are of some interest. The most notable building is the Tour Moncade, a pentagonal tower of the 13th century, once the keep of a castle of the viscounts of Béarn, and now used as a meteorological observatory. A building of the 17th century is all that remains of the old Calvinist university (see below). The town hall is a modern building containing the library.

Economy
The spinning and weaving of hemp and flax, especially of the fabric called toile de Béarn, flour-milling, the manufacture of paper and of leather, and the preparation of hams known as jambons de Bayonne and other delicacies, are among its industries. There are quarries of stone and marble in the area, and the town has a thriving trade in leather, hams, and lime.

Administration
Orthez has a judicial court but not an appeals court. It was the seat of a subprefecture from 1800 until 1926 (the dates of the creation and abolition of the arrondissement (district) of Orthez).

Sports
Orthez is known in sport for basketball with Élan Béarnais Pau-Orthez team, which is one of the most successful French basketball clubs. Orthez is the smallest town of the continent to have won a Euro Cup (Korać Cup in 1984) in all sports. Élan Béarnais Pau-Orthez moved to Pau in 1991.

Orthez was the site for the start of Stage 16 in the 2007 Tour de France.

The main sports clubs of the city are:

Rugby :
US Orthez (playing in Fédérale 1 championship)

Soccer :
Elan Béarnais Orthez

Basketball :
US Orthez
Élan Béarnais Orthez (from 1908 to 1991)

Notable natives and residents
Gaston III Febus (1331–1391), viscount of Bearn
Jeanne d'Albret (1528–1572), Queen of Navarre and mother of French King Henry IV
Pierre-Adolphe Lafargue (1818-1869), newspaper publisher and educator in Marksville, Louisiana, born in Orthez
Gaston Planté (1834–1889), inventor of lead-acid battery in 1859
Francis Planté (1839–1934), French pianist famed as one of the first recording artists.
Armand Reclus (1843–1927), theorized the Panama Canal
Onésime Reclus (1837-1916), born here, geographer
Francis Jammes (1868–1938), poet
Jean-Louis Curtis (1917–1995), novelist
Daniel d'Auger de Subercase (1661-1732), soldier
Alain Ducasse (b.1956), chef.
Joël Suhubiette (b.1962), choral conductor

Twin towns - sister cities

Locale

See also
Communes of the Pyrénées-Atlantiques department

References

External links

Mairie of Orthez

Communes of Pyrénées-Atlantiques
Pyrénées-Atlantiques communes articles needing translation from French Wikipedia